Dovetail Joint was a rock band that formed in Chicago, Illinois in 1992.  The band featured guitar/vocalist Charles Gladfelter, guitarist Robert Byrne, bassist Jon Kooker, and drummer Joe Dapier. After several years of playing locally, as well as independently releasing their self-titled album in 1995, the band started to garner interest after their song "Level on the Inside" was featured on an annual compilation disc of local radio station WKQX Q101. Columbia Records quickly signed the band and released 001 in early 1999.  "Level" turned out to be the band's only commercial hit, and Columbia dropped the band before releasing a second album.  An independently released EP released in 2002 would turn out to be their last.

Gladfelter and Byrne regrouped to form the band Ivory Wire along with drummer Henry Jansen which has since put out two albums to date and has gone on an official hiatus.

History

Early days (1992–1996) 
Dapier and Gladfelter had been playing music together since they were students at New Trier High School. Gladfelter attended college at the University of Iowa for two years before dropping out to pursue a career in music; he then convinced Dapier to drop out as well, and both moved to Wilmette, Illinois. Dovetail Joint's first show was in Chicago at the Vic Theater on August 14, 1992. The band's lineup was Chuck Gladfelter (guitar, vocals), Joe Dapier (drums), and Solomon Snyder (bass); later guitarist Robert Byrne was in the audience seeing them for the first time. According to a 1999 interview with Gladfelter, the band's name has no meaning: "It's a band name. It's obtuse. There's no significance. I guess we could have called ourselves Kleenex or toothpaste." In 1994, Robert Byrne joined the band as guitarist.

In April 1995, they entered Chicago's Warzone Studios with producer/engineer Scott Ramsayer and recorded their self-titled debut, later known as The Black Album. They tracked 15 songs and their friend Jack Buck agreed to finance the project under the name Buckshot Records.

The band attracted attention from record labels two times in their early years which did not result in a signing. One was from producer Glen Ballard, who was starting his own label called Java Records. The band was to fly to Los Angeles to record with Ballard in 1997, but Java cancelled soon after.

Around this time, Solomon's brother, Matt Walker (Filter), was enlisted as the new drummer for The Smashing Pumpkins when Jimmy Chamberlin was let go. After Matt's stint with the Pumpkins, he and several other friends formed a band called Cupcakes. Solomon left the Joint to play bass with Cupcakes. DreamWorks Records signed Cupcakes after the bands’ fourth performance. Dovetail Joint needed a new bass player, and Scott Tallarida offered to fill in.

Aware, Columbia, and "Level on the Inside" (1997–1999) 
In 1997, local independent label Aware Records, which had recently signed a deal with Columbia Records, included the band on the label's annual compilation of unsigned bands, Aware 5 (1997). The track chosen for the compilation was a demo version of "This is My Home," produced by Scott Tallarida. In February 1998, Aware and manager Roger Jansen convinced the group to sign a publishing deal with EMI, and soon after the band began working with producer John Fields.

During this time, Scott Tallarida was still playing bass, but indicated that he wanted to pursue his own musical aspirations. The second replacement was Mick Vaughn, producer of early Dovetail Joint recordings. Vaughn only performed one Joint show and then moved to North Carolina. However, in January 1998 he played bass for the first John Fields session at his Minneapolis studio Funkytown, where the band wrote the song "Level on the Inside." Kooker began rehearsing on bass with the band in 1998, joining officially in the fall of that year.

The band soon signed with Columbia Records and continued working with Fields. In the spring of 1998, Jansen and Latterman worked out an arrangement with Columbia Records where the band would release an EP exclusively with Aware prior to their major label debut on Columbia/Aware. That May, Chicago alternative radio station Q101 sought submissions from local bands for their first annual compilation CD: Local 101. "Level on the Inside" was chosen to be the first track of 18 songs on the disc and would receive hundreds of spins at Q101 that summer. The song was soon picked up by other radio stations in the Midwest, and led to the band selling out shows at Chicago venues House of Blues and Metro. Aware pushed forward the EP's release to respond to the growing interest; the six-track Level EP was released by Aware in September 1998.

On January 26, 1999, Columbia Records/Aware Records released Dovetail Joint's major label debut, 001. The album, produced by Fields and mixed by Jack Joseph Puig, had sold 16,000 copies by May. Nationally, "Level on the Inside" started experiencing the same success it continued to enjoy in Chicago. The song reached #38 on the Billboard Mainstream Rock chart in early 1999, and #17 on the Modern Rock Tracks chart, where it stayed for 13 weeks. Columbia agreed to produce a video for "Level on the Inside", directed by Phil Harder.

Following the video shoot, the band returned to the road for several months of touring in support of the album and single. Having a radio single earned the band opening slots on U.S. tours with bands such as The Marvelous 3 and Train. The Joint also did two-week stints with the Goo Goo Dolls, Cheap Trick, Collective Soul, and Ben Folds Five. Other shows included playing with The Black Crowes, Silverchair, Everclear, Blink 182, Third Eye Blind, Eve 6, Local H, and Orgy. Roger Jansen was profiled in Guitar Player magazine in June 1999.

In April 1999, "Beautiful" was chosen as Dovetail Joint's second single; Chris Lord-Alge re-mixed the song at his Los Angeles studio. Touring continued until September 1999. The band returned to Chicago and began writing their follow up effort.

Later years and breakup (2000–2010) 
In late 1999, the band wrote 30 songs slated for the tentatively titled Killing of Cool album. The album was produced by Fields and optioned by Columbia, but strain between the label and the band led to the group's departure from Columbia/Aware before it was officially released.

On January 15, 2002, E.P. from the Underclass was released; the band broke up later that year.

On August 14, 2010 Dovetail Joint reunited to play one show at Lincoln Hall in Chicago.

Official discography

Studio albums

Demo albums

Extended plays

References

External links 
 The Official Dovetail Joint Website
 The Official Ivorywire Website (featuring members from Dovetail Joint)

Musical groups established in 1992
Musical groups disestablished in 2002
Alternative rock groups from Chicago